Verkhnyaya Gryaznukha is a rural locality (a selo) in Ust-Gryaznukhinskoye Rural Settlement, Kamyshinsky District, Volgograd Oblast, Russia. The population was 532 as of 2010. There are 3 streets.

Geography 
Verkhnyaya Gryaznukha is located in steppe, on the Volga Upland, on the left bank of the Gryaznukha River, 52 km north of Kamyshin (the district's administrative centre) by road. Ust-Gryaznikha is the nearest rural locality.

References 

Rural localities in Kamyshinsky District